Andegameryx is an extinct genus belonging to the family Hypertragulidae, within the order Artiodactyla, endemic to Europe during the Miocene, living 22.4—20 Ma, existing for approximately .

Andegameryx were primitive and ancient ruminants, resembling small deer or musk deer, although they were more closely related to modern chevrotains. Its diet is stated to be that of a frugivore. The only known fossil was found in Zaragoza, Spain.

Taxonomy
Andegameryx was named by Ginsburg (1971). It was assigned to Hypertragulidae by Carroll (1988).

References

Miocene even-toed ungulates
Miocene mammals of Europe
Prehistoric even-toed ungulate genera